The 2005 Alexandria riot was an anti-Christian riot in the Egyptian port city of Alexandria.  The riot erupted on 21 October when a group of  Muslims staged a demonstration outside St. George's, a Coptic church, to protest a play they said offended Islam which resulted in 3 deaths. The situation got out of hand after some protesters began throwing stones at the building and at police who were present at the scene.

References

Alexandria riot
Alexandria riot
Copts in Alexandria
Islamic terrorist incidents in 2005
Persecution of Copts
Religion in Egypt
Religious riots
Religiously motivated violence in Egypt
Republic of Egypt
Riots and civil disorder in Egypt
Sectarian violence
Terrorist incidents in Egypt in 2005